Jean de Nanteuil was a French bishop of Troyes from 1269 to 1295 or 1298. His brother was Thibaud de Nanteuil, cardinal of Beauvais.

References

Date of birth unknown
Date of death unknown
13th-century French Roman Catholic bishops